Allott is a surname. Notable people with the surname include:

Antony Nicholas Allott (1924–2002), English academic
Geoff Allott (born 1971), New Zealand cricketer
Gordon L. Allott (1907–1989), American politician
Jeannie Allott (born 1956), English/Dutch footballer
Kenneth Allott (1912–1973), British poet
Mark Allott (born 1977), English footballer
Miriam Allott (1920–2010), English literary scholar
Molly Allott (1918–2013), Royal Air Force officer
Nick Allott (born 1954), British theatre producer
Paul Allott (born 1956), English cricketer
Robert Allott, 17th-century English editor, poet and writer
Tommy Allott (1908–1975), English motorcycle speedway rider
William Dixon Allott (c. 1817–1892), Mayor of Adelaide

See also
Allot (disambiguation)